John D. Joannopoulos (born 1947) is an American physicist, focused in condensed matter theory. He is currently the Francis Wright Davis Professor of Physics at Massachusetts Institute of Technology, an Elected Member of the National Academy of Sciences (NAS), an Elected Member of the American Academy of Arts and Sciences (AAA&S), and an Elected Fellow of the American Association for the Advancement of Science (AAAS) and American Physical Society (APS).

Joannopoulos was born in New York City to Greek parents. He is the recipient of numerous awards and honors. Most recently, in 2015, the Optical Society of America (OSA) awarded him the Max Born Award and the APS awarded him the Aneesur Rahman Prize for Computational Physics, both significant awards.

Joannopoulos is also the director of the Institute for Soldier Nanotechnologies. He first gained that position in 2006.

Joannopoulos has been on the MIT faculty since 1974. He holds his BA and PhD from the University of California, Berkeley, the latter received in 1974.

Joannopoulos has helped set the theoretical foundations of key computational techniques for realistic and microscopic studies of complex materials systems, including the electronic, vibrational, and optical structure of crystalline and amorphous solids, their surfaces, interfaces, and defects; localization in disordered systems; and the first ab-inito studies of phase transitions and critical phenomena. In the early nineties, he also helped spawn the development of a new class of materials, Photonic Crystals, that provide new mechanisms to control the flow of light and have revolutionized the fields of optical and lightwave physics.

See also

 Leslie Kolodziejski, fellow MIT physicist and collaborator of Joannopoulos'

References

1947 births
Living people
Fellows of the American Association for the Advancement of Science
Fellows of the American Physical Society
Massachusetts Institute of Technology School of Science faculty
21st-century American physicists
American people of Greek descent
University of California, Berkeley alumni
Computational physicists
Members of the United States National Academy of Sciences
Optical physicists